The national program for women's ice hockey in Finland had 5,858 active players in 2019. The Finnish Ice Hockey Association organizes both the national women's program and the three levels of domestic women's leagues in Finland.

History
The first women's hockey teams were founded in Finland in the early 1970s but it took many years for women's ice hockey to gain enough popularity and participation to warrant the creation of a national league. In 1978, the first "lipstick tournament" was held, creating an informal national women's championship, though records of the competition outcomes are not available.

In 1982 the Naisten SM-sarja was founded as the first elite women's national league in Finland. The first season was played in two divisions of five teams each (10 teams total) and the first playoffs were held in Tampere on March 12 and 13, 1983. Since its founding, the number of teams per season has ranged from 8 to 13. In 2017, the Naisten SM-sarja was renamed Naisten Liiga and in 2018 the number of teams was expanded to the league's original number of 10.

The Finland women's national team entered international competition in the 1988-1989 season, quickly claiming its first gold at the 1989 IIHF European Women Championships. The team has remained successful since its emergence on the international stage, medalling in three Olympics and 13 Women's World Championships. Most recently, Finland took silver at the 2019 Women's World Championship after a controversial loss in the finals to the United States.

Developmental leagues
The number of young women in the junior level increased slowly, from 500 players at the beginning to approximately 2000 today. The growth rate was not satisfactory, so the Finnish Ice Hockey Association decided to invest in development of women's ice hockey by supporting leagues. The number of teams considerably increased: there are now 12 teams in the Women's 1st Division, is Naisten Mestis (second level after the Naisten Liiga).

Lohko 1

Lohko 2

Tournaments
The following IIHF tournaments were hosted in Finland.

Leading scorers

IIHF Worlds
Riikka Sallinen (née Nieminen, previously Välilä) is Finland’s all-time leader with 41 points (23 goals, 18 assists). She participated in four IIHF Worlds. She led two World Championships (1994 and 1997) in scoring. Her 41 points ranks seventh all-time in World Championship scoring. She appeared in 118 games for Finland, scoring 109 goals, 95 assists and 204 points.
Tiia Reima ranks second all-time with 34 points (14 goals, 20 assists) and participated in six tournaments. Her 20 assists is the Finnish career mark for most assists in World Championship play. She earned five bronze medals at the '90, '92, '94, '97 and '99 World Championships.

Olympics
Riikka Sallinen ranks as the all time leading Olympic scorer for Finland. She was the top point producer at the 1998 Olympic Winter Games.

Famous firsts
1983: Official start of a women's elite league in Finland
1989: Naisleijonat won the first Women’s European Championships
1990: Finland claimed the bronze in the first IIHF Women's World Championships
May 21, 2010: Riikka Sallinen was inducted into the IIHF Hall of Fame in Cologne, Germany. She was only the fourth woman to receive this honor and the first from Finland.

Finnish women in NCAA

See also
Finland women's national ice hockey team
Finland women's national under-18 ice hockey team
Naisten Liiga

References

External links
     Women's Hockey History in Finland 
 Women's Finnish championship